The Bibby Baronetcy, of Tarporley in the County Palatine of Chester, is a title in the Baronetage of the United Kingdom. It was created on 8 July 1959 for Sir Harold Bibby, Chairman of the Bibby Line.

As of 2010 the title is held by Sir Harold's grandson, the third Baronet, who succeeded his father in 2002.

Bibby baronets, of Tarporley (1959)
Sir (Arthur) Harold Bibby, 1st Baronet, Kt., DSO (1889–1986)
Sir Derek James Bibby, 2nd Baronet, MC (1922–2002)
Sir Michael James Bibby, 3rd Baronet (born 1963)

Arms

References

Kidd, Charles, Williamson, David (editors). Debrett's Peerage and Baronetage (1990 edition). New York: St Martin's Press, 1990.

Bibby